A square mil is a unit of area, equal to the area of a square with sides of length one mil. A mil is one thousandth of an international inch. This unit of area is usually used in specifying the area of the cross section of a wire or cable.

Equivalence to other units of area
1 square mil is equal to:
 1 millionth of a square inch (1 square inch is equal to 1 million square mils)
 6.4516×10−10 square metres
 about 1.273 circular mils (1 circular mil is equal to about 0.7854 square mils). Where 1.273 is (1÷(π÷4)) and where 0.7854 is (π÷4).

See also
 Circular mil
 Area of a circle

Units of area
Decimalisation